Daviess County Public Schools is a school district that manages the public schools in
Daviess County, Kentucky, USA. However, within the city limits, Owensboro Public Schools is an independent district from the county schools.

Apollo High School

Apollo High School is a high school located in Owensboro, Kentucky.  Named after the Apollo Space Program, Apollo opened in 1969 as a junior high school. Apollo converted to a high school in 1972. There are about 1,200 students. Their mascot is the eagle with the school colors of blue and white.

Daviess County High School

Daviess County High School is a high school in Owensboro. It is one of the largest schools in the area with roughly 1750 students. Their mascot is the Panther with the school colors of red and white. The current principal is Matt Mason.

Heritage Park High School
After Beacon Central was closed, this school opened in 2015.  From 2015 to 2020, Heritage Park housed sophomores, juniors and seniors. Beginning with the 2020–2021 school year, Heritage Park added a freshman class. The school specializes in innovative teaching and learning, along with credit recovery for upperclassmen. It has a student population of approximately 150.

College View Middle School
College View Middle School hold students grades 6–8 in Owensboro. The school is named "College View", because it is across the street of Owensboro Community and Technical College. The nickname is the Vikings and colors are purple and white. The middle school feeds into both Apollo High School and Daviess County High School. The schools color of purple is a result of this combining the blue of Apollo High School and the red of Daviess County High School. Its principal is Jennifer Crume.

Daviess County Middle School
Daviess County Middle School holds grades 6–8 in Owensboro. The mascot is the Panther and colors are red and white.

Burns Middle School
Burns Middle School holds grades 6–8 in Owensboro. The mascot is the Fox and colors are blue and white. Its current principal is Dane Ferguson and the current vice principal is Kendra Bronsink.

External links
 Official site

School districts in Kentucky
Education in Daviess County, Kentucky